Hamida Akbari is an ethnic Hazara politician from Afghanistan, who was the representative of the people of Maidan Wardak province in the 16th term of the Afghan Parliament.

Early life 
Hamida Akbari was born in 1974 in Kabul but originally from Behsud district, Maidan Wardak province. She received her bachelor's degree in engineering from Kabul University.

See also 

 List of Hazara people

References 

Living people
1974 births
Hazara politicians
People from Maidan Wardak Province
Kabul University alumni